Chetco Peak is a mountain in the Klamath Mountains of southwestern Oregon in the United States.

The name of the peak and that of the nearby Chetco River was derived from the name of a small tribe of Native Americans, the Chetco people, who originally lived along the lower Chetco River in Curry County.

References

External links 
 

Mountains of Oregon
Mountains of Curry County, Oregon